The Police Scotland Fife Pipe Band is a Grade 1 pipe band from Fife in Scotland, established in September 2007.

History
The band was established in September 2007 as the Fife Constabulary Pipe Band, and was placed in the senior grade by the Royal Scottish Pipe Band Association in February the following year. Their first competition, at the Dunbar Highland Games in May 2008, saw them awarded first prize. In August of the same year they made their first appearance at the World Pipe Band Championships and gained entry into the grade one final, having achieved second place among fourteen bands in the morning qualifying round.

The first Pipe Major was James Murray, with Andrew Mathieson starting as Pipe Sergeant, both having left Grade 1 band Shotts and Dykehead. When James Murray announced he was to emigrate to Australia, Mathieson took over as Pipe Major. Douglas Murray became Pipe Major in July 2013 after Andrew Mathieson stepped down, citing time constraints as a result of increasing family commitments and his work with the junior band.

In September 2008 the drum corps was replaced by that of the Clan Gregor Society Pipe Band, resulting in the disbandment of the Clan Gregor band.

Following the merger of Scottish territorial forces and the Scottish Crime and Drug Enforcement Agency into Police Scotland, the band's name was changed from the Fife Constabulary Pipe Band to the Police Scotland Fife Pipe Band.

Results
The band received its first placing in a Major championship when in 2011 it was placed 6th in the Scottish Pipe Band Championships.

In 2012 and 2013, the band was placed mid-table in most of the Major championships.

2018 has been the most successful season to date. The Band finished in the top 6 in all major championships, placed 6th at the Worlds with 3rd place in the MSR final and finished 5th in the Champions of Champions table for 2018.

Concerts
The Police Scotland Fife Pipe Band celebrated their 10years jubilee with the first major concert in Aberdeen - "Decade on the Beat".

Pipe Majors
James Murray (2007-2011)
Andrew Mathieson (2011-2013)
Douglas Murray (2013-2021)
David Wilton (2021-    )

Leading Drummers
Lee Innes (2007 - 2008)
Mick O'Neill (2008-    )

Drum Majors
Senior Drum Major Thomas Richard Lorenzen (Aug 2015 -   )
 Drum Major Lauren Hanna (Nov 2022 -  )

References

External links
 

Grade 1 pipe bands
Scottish pipe bands
Musical groups established in 2007
2007 establishments in Scotland
Police bands
Kirkcaldy